Wildhorse Township is a township in Graham County, Kansas, USA.  As of the 2000 census, its population was 252.

Geography
According to the USGS, it contains three cemeteries: Fagan, Samuels and Wild Horse.

The streams of Coon Creek, Skunk Creek, West Branch Wild Horse Creek and Wild Horse Creek run through this township.

References
 USGS Geographic Names Information System (GNIS)

External links
 US-Counties.com
 City-Data.com

Townships in Graham County, Kansas
Townships in Kansas